Gigi Lai (born 1 October 1971) is a Hong Kong actress and singer. Entering the entertainment industry in 1985, Lai was under a contract with the television station TVB from 1991 until she retired in 2008. Nicknamed by the Hong Kong media as the "Goddess of Beauty" (愛美神), she is best known for her roles in The Heaven Sword and Dragon Saber (2000), War and Beauty (2004), for which she won the TVB Anniversary Award for Best Actress, The Charm Beneath (2005), The Dance of Passion (2006), and The Gem of Life (2009).

Early life 
On 1 October 1971 Lai was born in Hong Kong. Lai's grandfather Lai Man-Wai was a key figure of the first generation of Hong Kong filmmakers, and her grandmother Lim Cho Cho was a silent era star. Lai's father was deaf.

Career 
When Lai's family went bankrupt, she entered the entertainment industry at the age of 14 to earn money to support her family and her younger brother's education in England. Lai began her career as a singer, releasing several albums in the 1990s in both Cantonese and Mandarin.

In her early acting career, Lai turned down roles that she felt compromised her public persona. However, she overcame her "superficial and childish image" later and began to embrace many critically acclaimed roles. She won the TVB Anniversary Award for Best Actress for her role in War and Beauty. Lai also performed in several box office hits, including the Young and Dangerous film series. At the premiere of The Gem of Life, Lai announced that she would be retiring from the industry to concentrate on looking after her brother's business after he was seriously injured in a car accident in 2007.

Personal life and marriage
In 2008, Lai married businessman Patrick Ma Ting-kung to rumours that they were expecting their first child, however Lai later dismissed the rumours of her pregnancy.

In March 2010, Lai confirmed that she was pregnant with twins, and on July 25, 2010, she gave birth to two girls, Pricia and Gianna. On October 8, 2012, she gave birth to her third daughter, Pegella.

Filmography

Films

Television

Awards
1993 Best Selling Single
1994 Top 10 Chinese Songs (Silver Medal)
1994 JSG Best New Talent Singer 
2004 TVB 37th Anniversary – Best Actress Award, as Yuk Ying in War and Beauty
2004 TVB 37th Anniversary – Best Character Award, as Yuk Ying in War and Beauty
2004 Black and White Television Characters Awards, Favourite Actress Award
2004 Metro's Best Duet Collaboration Award for the Song “Poison” with Bowie Lam
2004 Metroshowbiz TV awards – Top 10 TV Actors and Actresses
2004 Watson's Annual Health & Beauty Awards – Artiste with Perfect Skin
2005 TVB Weekly Popularity Awards – Most Popular Magazine Cover Artiste
2005 TVB Weekly Popularity Awards – Most Popular Female Artiste
2005 TVB Weekly Popularity Awards – Most Popular Female in Ancient Drama
2005 TVB Weekly Popularity Awards – Most Popular of them all
2005 Next Magazine TV Awards Top 10 TV Artists
2005 Next Magazine Sponsorship Award - Best Style Actress
2005 Top Ten Best Dressed Personalities Awards 
2005 Watson's Annual Health & Beauty Awards – Artiste with Perfect Skin
2005 Astro TV Drama Award – Favourite Female Character Award for War and Beauty
2005 Astro TV Drama Award – Favourite Lethal Beauty Award for War and Beauty
2005 Metroshowbiz TV awards – Top 10 TV Actors and Actresses
2006 TVB Weekly Popularity Awards – Top 10 TV Artists
2006 Watson's Annual Health & Beauty Awards – Artiste with Perfect Skin
2006 China Entertainment Awards – Most Popular Non-Mainland Actress 
2007 Astro TV Drama Award – Favorite Moment Award for Frances in Healing Hands 3
2007 Health Choice Award
2007 China/HK 10th Entertainment Awards - Most Popular Actress Award
2007 China/HK 10th Entertainment Awards - Best Couple Award with Bowie Lam
2007 Watson's HWB Awards - Top Diamond Award
2007 Singapore I-weekly Magazine - Top 10 Most Loved Hong Kong Actresses 
2007 TVB 40th Anniversary - Mainland Audience's Fave TVB Actress Award
2008 Astro TV Drama Award – Favourite Actress Award for Dance of Passion 
2008 Astro TV Drama Award – Favourite Character Award for Dance of Passion
2008 Hong Kong-Asia Film Financing Forum - Top Six Most Popular Hong Kong TV Female Artistes
2008 HKFDA 20th Annual Best Dressed Personalities Awards
2009 New York Festivals Television and Film Award - Hong Kong, TVB: Best Performance for The Ultimate Crime Fighter

References

External links

Gigi Lai at the Hong Kong Movie DataBase
spcnet.tv entry

 	 

|-
! colspan="3" style="background: #DAA520;" | TVB Anniversary Awards

1971 births
Living people
Alumni of The Hong Kong Academy for Performing Arts
Hong Kong film actresses
Hong Kong television actresses
People from Zhaoqing
TVB veteran actors
Hong Kong child actresses
20th-century Hong Kong actresses
21st-century Hong Kong actresses
21st-century Hong Kong women singers
Hong Kong idols